South English is a city in Keokuk County, Iowa, United States. The population was 202 at the time of the 2020 census. It is named for the English River.

Geography
South English is located at  (41.452199, -92.089649).

Demographics

2010 census
As of the census of 2010, there were 212 people, 88 households, and 58 families living in the city. The racial makeup of the city was 99.1% White and 0.9% from two or more races. Hispanic or Latino of any race were 1.9% of the population.

There were 88 households, of which 30.7% had children under the age of 18 living with them, 47.7% were married couples living together, 10.2% had a female householder with no husband present, 8.0% had a male householder with no wife present, and 34.1% were non-families. 29.5% of all households were made up of individuals, and 12.5% had someone living alone who was 65 years of age or older. The average household size was 2.41 and the average family size was 2.98.

The median age in the city was 37.3 years. 29.2% of residents were under the age of 18; 3.3% were between the ages of 18 and 24; 26% were from 25 to 44; 29.7% were from 45 to 64; and 11.8% were 65 years of age or older. The gender makeup of the city was 53.8% male and 46.2% female.

2000 census
As of the census of 2000, there were 213 people, 96 households, and 60 families living in the city. The racial makeup of the city was 99.06% White, 0.47% from other races, and 0.47% from two or more races. Hispanic or Latino of any race were 0.94% of the population.

There were 96 households, out of which 21.9% had children under the age of 18 living with them, 54.2% were married couples living together, 6.3% had a female householder with no husband present, and 36.5% were non-families. 34.4% of all households were made up of individuals, and 17.7% had someone living alone who was 65 years of age or older. The average household size was 2.22 and the average family size was 2.84.

Age spread:  23.9% under the age of 18, 4.7% from 18 to 24, 28.6% from 25 to 44, 24.9% from 45 to 64, and 17.8% who were 65 years of age or older. The median age was 42 years. For every 100 females, there were 97.2 males. For every 100 females age 18 and over, there were 84.1 males.

The median income for a household in the city was $36,429, and the median income for a family was $51,071. Males had a median income of $30,750 versus $30,192 for females. The per capita income for the city was $21,833. About 3.1% of families and 6.7% of the population were below the poverty line, including 14.6% of those under the age of eighteen and 15.4% of those 65 or over.

Education
It is within the English Valleys Community School District.

See also
 Tally's War

References

Cities in Keokuk County, Iowa
Cities in Iowa